Ruckus may refer to:

People with the name
 Ruckus (wrestler), ring name of pro wrestler Claude Marrow
 Obe "Rukus" Watson, a member of The Trinity Band who mixes as DJ Rukus

Arts, entertainment, and media
 Ruckus (album), a 2003 album from the group Galactic
 Ruckus (film) a 1981 action-thriller film, starring Dirk Benedict
 Ruckus (game show), a short-lived 1991 syndicated game show with The Amazing Johnathan
 Ruckus, a children's variation of the card game Rummy

Fictional characters
 Ruckus (comics), a mutant supervillain from Marvel Comics
 Ruckus (Transformers), a Decepticon in the Transformers toy line
 Uncle Ruckus, a character from the comic strip and television show The Boondocks

Brands and enterprises
 Ruckus Network, formerly a provider of digital entertainment services for all American colleges and universities
 Ruckus Networks, formerly known as Ruckus Wireless, a computer networking company selling wired and wireless networking equipment and software
 Honda Ruckus, a model of motor scooter made by Honda

Organizations
 Ruckus Society, an organization that provides training in techniques of political activism

See also
 Rumpus (disambiguation)